The Spirit 23, also called the North American 23, is an American trailerable sailboat that was designed by Robert Finch as a cruiser and first built in 1978.

Production
The design was built by Glastron in the United States, starting in 1976, initially by their North American Yachts subsidiary in Henderson, Tennessee, as the North American 23. Morgan Yachts, builders of the North American 40, threatened a lawsuit over the naming, resulting in North American Yachts being sold and the boat being built starting in 1978 by a different Glastron subsidiary, Spirit Yachts, in Austin, Texas as the Spirit 23. Production was ended in 1981.

Design
The Spirit 23 is a recreational keelboat, built predominantly of fiberglass, with wood trim and an optional cabin "pop-top" for increased headroom. It has a masthead sloop rig, a raked stem, a reverse transom, a transom-hung rudder controlled by a tiller and a stub keel with a retractable centerboard or with a fixed fin keel. A "kick-up" rudder was a factory option.

The boat is normally fitted with a small  outboard motor for docking and maneuvering.

The design has sleeping accommodation for four people, with a double "V"-berth in the bow cabin, a drop-down dinette and a straight settee in the main cabin. An alternate main cabin plan provided two settee berths in place of the dinette. The galley is located on the starboard side just aft of the bow cabin and is equipped with a two-burner stove and a sink. The head is located in the bow cabin on the port side under the "V"-berth.

Variants
North American 23
Original model built from 1976 to 1978 and equipped with a stub keel and centerboard. It displaces  and carries  of ballast.
Spirit 23
This centerboard model is the re-designated North American 23, introduced in 1978 under this name and built until 1981. It displaces  and carries  of ballast.
Spirit 23 K
This fixed keel model was introduced in 1978 and built until 1981. It has a swept fin keel, a taller mast with more sail area, a mid-cockpit mainsheet traveler and a one-piece rudder made from fiberglass. It displaces  and carries  of lead ballast.

See also
List of sailing boat types

References

External links
Photo of a Spirit 23

Keelboats
1970s sailboat type designs
Sailing yachts 
Trailer sailers
Sailboat type designs by Robert Finch
Sailboat types built by Glastron